Vanung University (VNU) is a private university in Zhongli District, Taoyuan City, Taiwan.

Vanung University offers a wide range of academic programs, including undergraduate and graduate degree programs in fields such as business, engineering, design, humanities, and social sciences. The university has six colleges, including the College of Business, the College of Engineering, the College of Design, the College of Humanities, the College of Social Sciences, and the College of General Studies.

History
VNU was originally established as Van Nung School of Industrial Skills on 27 March 1972. In 1973, it was renamed to Van Nung Institute of Industry. In 1990, it was again renamed Van Nung Institute of Industry and Commerce. In 1999, it was upgraded to Van Nung Institute of Technology. Finally on 1 February 2004, the institute was renamed Vanung University.

Faculties
 College of Aviation and Engineering
 College of Design
 College of Tourism, Hospitality and Management

See also
 List of universities in Taiwan

References

1972 establishments in Taiwan
Educational institutions established in 1972
Universities and colleges in Taoyuan City
Universities and colleges in Taiwan
Technical universities and colleges in Taiwan